Devi Ranjan Tripathy is an Indian politician of Biju Janata Dal from Odisha. He is the current MLA of Odisha Legislative Assembly from Banki (Vidhan Sabha constituency). He is the son of Pravat Tripathy who is the senior leader of Biju Janata Dal and 4 times MLA from Banki (Vidhan Sabha constituency). He is also the State President of Biju Chhatra Janta Dal, the student wing of Biju Janata Dal.

References 

Members of the Odisha Legislative Assembly
Living people
Biju Janata Dal politicians
Year of birth missing (living people)
Odisha MLAs 2019–2024